Ray Clearwater (born November 10, 1942) is a Canadian retired professional ice hockey player who played 214 games in the World Hockey Association for the Cleveland Crusaders and Minnesota Fighting Saints.

Clearwater was born in Winnipeg, Manitoba. He played junior hockey with the Winnipeg Braves of the Manitoba Junior Hockey League from 1960 to 1963. He turned professional in 1963 with the New Haven Blades. He played for various teams in North American minor professional leagues until 1972 when the WHA was formed and he joined the new Cleveland Crusaders team. He played 3 seasons with Cleveland and several games for the Minnesota Fighting Saints.

References

External links

1942 births
Baltimore Clippers players
Canadian ice hockey defencemen
Cleveland Crusaders players
Living people
Minnesota Fighting Saints players
Ice hockey people from Winnipeg